Port Penn is a census-designated place located in St. Georges Hundred, southern New Castle County, Delaware, United States, below the Chesapeake and Delaware Canal on the west bank of the Delaware River. Port Penn is home to the Port Penn Interpretive Center. Its population is estimated at 252.

Education
Port Penn is in the Colonial School District. It operates William Penn High School.

References

External links

Port Penn Area Historical Society

Unincorporated communities in New Castle County, Delaware
Unincorporated communities in Delaware